The Ambassador of the United Kingdom to Cambodia is the United Kingdom's foremost diplomatic representative in the Kingdom of Cambodia, and head of the UK's diplomatic mission in Cambodia.  The official title is His Britannic Majesty's Ambassador to the Kingdom of Cambodia.

List of heads of mission

Non-resident Minister
1946–1947: William Meiklereid
1948–1950: Frank Gibbs
No representation between 1950 and 1951, due to deteriorating conditions of Indo-China War

Non-resident Minister Plenipotentiary and Envoy Extraordinary
1951: Frank Gibbs
1951–1954: Hubert Graves

Ambassador
1954–1956: Richard Heppel
1956–1958: Norman Brain
1958–1961: Frederic Garner
1961–1964: Peter Murray
1964–1966: Leslie Fielding
1966–1970: Harold Brown
1970–1973: Anthony Williams
1973–1975: John Powell-Jones
1975–1976: John Bushell
No representation between 1976 and 1991, due to Khmer Rouge government policy, then Vietnamese occupation

Representative with Personal Rank of Ambassador
1991–1994: David Burns

Ambassador
1994–1997: Paul Reddicliffe
1997–2000: George Edgar
2000–2005: Stephen Bridges
2008–2011: Andrew Mace
2011–2013: Mark Gooding
2014–2018: Bill Longhurst
2018–2022:  Tina Redshaw

2022 - : Dominic Williams

References

External links
UK and Cambodia, gov.uk

Cambodia
 
United Kingdom